Smith Micro Software, Inc., founded in 1982 by William W. Smith, Jr., is a developer and marketer of both enterprise and consumer-level software and services. Headquartered in Pittsburgh, Pennsylvania, Smith Micro maintains multiple domestic and international offices.  United States locations include  Aliso Viejo, California, and Pittsburgh, Pennsylvania. International offices are located throughout Europe and Asia. Currently, the company focuses on digital lifestyle solutions and security technologies, and is integrated into the evolving wireless media industry, as indicated by partnerships with cellular service providers such as Verizon Wireless, AT&T, and Sprint Corporation, now owned by T-Mobile US after the Sprint & T-Mobile merger in April 2020.

Corporate history

Smith Micro's initial focus was on dial-up modem and fax software technology, distributing predominantly to OEM computer software/hardware manufacturers. Smith Micro established an IPO in 1995, and became publicly traded in the NASDAQ under the symbol SMSI. Initial stock  values were approx. $12.75 per share.

As the company entered the 90's, dial-up internet was quickly being replaced by cable internet, DSL, and wireless broadband due to substantially higher speeds and increased reliability. This change led Smith Micro to venture into wireless and mobile network software. Network connection management became an expertise of the company and, Smith Micro quickly developed products of interest to large-scale mobile network operators such as AT&T, Bell Canada, Orange, Sprint, T-Mobile, Verizon, and Vodafone. While fax and modem-related products were still a part of their portfolio, the QuickLink Platform of wireless connection managers became a primary source of revenue in the early 2000s.

By 2005, Smith Micro acquired Allume Systems and their StuffIt data compression software. Soon after, Smith Micro acquired Israel-based image editing company, PhoTags. Smith Micro followed with two more acquisitions, (e frontier America and busineSMS.com Software.) By acquiring these smaller companies, Smith Micro rapidly expanded its consumer business presence, however the company retained focus on network and wireless-related products.

In early 2008, the company began to expand its portfolio with the addition of wireless access and mobile services. Smith Micro introduced multiple solutions for enhanced mobile communications, such as push-to-talk software, visual voicemail services, and video streaming. Smith Micro also expressed interest in WiMAX broadband, a newly developed cellular technology which was considered to be a 4G wireless protocol and the replacement of current 3G cellular systems.

In 2019, Smith Micro entered the retail technology space with its acquisition of ISM Connect, LLC’s Smart Retail product suite. Most recently, the company has continued to expand its family safety business through the acquisitions of  Circle Media Labs’ operator business in February 2020, and the Family Safety Mobile Business of Avast Software s.r.o in April 2021.

Products

Family safety

 SafePath
SafePath Home
SafePath IoT
SafePath Family

Communications
 CommSuite VVM (Visual Voicemail)
 CommSuite VTT (Voice to Text)
 CommSuite Cloud
CommSuite Caller

Smart Retail 

ViewSpot
ViewSpot Studio (Retail Display Management)
 ViewSpot Dynamic Pricing Portal
ViewSpot Retail Analytics

Major acquisitions

References

Companies based in Aliso Viejo, California
Companies based in Pittsburgh
Software companies based in California
Software companies based in Pennsylvania
Companies listed on the Nasdaq
Software companies established in 1982
American companies established in 1982
1982 establishments in California
1995 initial public offerings
Software companies of the United States